2001 in professional wrestling describes the year's events in the world of professional wrestling.

List of notable promotions 
These promotions held notable shows in 2001.

Calendar of notable shows

January

February

March

April

May

June

July

August

September

October

November

December

Accomplishments and tournaments

AAA

WCW

WWF

Awards and honors

Pro Wrestling Illustrated

Wrestling Observer Newsletter

Wrestling Observer Newsletter Hall of Fame

Wrestling Observer Newsletter awards

Title changes

ECW

NJPW

WCW

WWF

Debuts
 Uncertain debut date
 Jay Lethal
 Kris Pavone 
 Nidia Guenard
 Sara Del Ray
 Heidenreich
 February 15 – Harashima
 May – Beth Phoenix
 June 23 – Damien Sandow
 October 2 – Maven
 October 6 – Daigoro Kashiwa
 November 4 – Gorgeous Matsuno
 November 11 – Ayako Sato
 November 23 - Finn Balor
 December 20 – Ken Ohka

Retirements
 Midnight (1999-March 2001)
 Tori (1988-September 2001)
 Al Green (1989-2001) (returned for a match in 2007) 
 Bushwhacker Butch (1964-September 2001)
 Duke Droese (1990-2001, returned for a couple of matches in 2019) 
 Hardbody Harrison (1995-March 2001)
 Dean Malenko (1979-December 2001, became a road agent for WWE)
 Nailz (1982-2001)
 One Man Gang (1977-2001) (returned to wrestle in 2007 until 2009) 
 Fred Ottman (1984-April 2001, returned to wrestle a couple of matches in 2009)
 Stan Hansen (1973- January 28, 2001, became commissioner for All Japan Pro Wrestling until 2007)

Births
January 14 - Cora Jade 
August 21 - Brooks Jensen 
November 8 - Julia Hart

Deaths
 January 3 – Kung Fu, 49
 January 4 – Villano I, 50
 January 18 - Rito Romero, 73
 January 29 - Smasher Sloan, 65
 March 26 - Benny McGuire, 54
 April 24 - Johnny Valentine, 72
 May 31 - Tex McKenzie, 70 
 July 16 – Terry Gordy, 40
 July 21 – Dennis Coralluzzo, 48
 July 27 – Rhonda Sing, 40
 October 7 – Chris Adams, 46
 December 4 - Ed Whalen, 74
 December 15 – Russ Haas, 27
 December 25 – Mike Davis, 45

See also
List of WCW pay-per-view events
List of WWA pay-per-view events
List of WWF pay-per-view events
List of ECW supercards and pay-per-view events
List of FMW supercards and pay-per-view events

References

 
professional wrestling